Chanayethazan Township is a township located in downtown Mandalay, Myanmar. The township is bounded by Aungmyethazan Township and the Mandalay Palace in the north, and Patheingyi Township in the east, Maha Aungmye Township in the south, and the Ayeyarwady river in the west. Chanayethazan is the main business district of the city. It is home to the city's biggest shopping center, the Zegyo Market and most international standard hotels.

Notable places
 Bahtoo Stadium
Htilin Monastery
 Mandalay Central Railway Station
 Mandalay General Hospital
 Myodaw Garden
 Police Academy of Mandalay
 University of Medicine, Mandalay
 Yadanabon Market
 Zegyo Market
 Mandalay City Development Committee

References

Townships of Mandalay
Townships of Mandalay Region
Mandalay